Dylan Bruno (born September 6, 1972) is an American actor and former model. His first major film role was a supporting part in Steven Spielberg's Saving Private Ryan (1998), followed by a lead role in the horror film The Rage: Carrie 2 (1999). On television, Bruno portrayed  FBI agent Colby Granger in Numbers and disgraced former Army Ranger Jason Paul Dean in NCIS.

Early life
Bruno was born September 6, 1972 in Milford, Connecticut, to actor Scott Bruno and the late Nancy (née Mendillo) Bruno. His older brother is film and television actor, director and producer Chris Bruno. Growing up, the brothers lived in Milford with their mother and spent time with their father on the Upper West Side of Manhattan.

In 1994, Bruno earned a Bachelor of Science degree in Environmental Engineering from MIT, where he played varsity football as a linebacker. "When I got into MIT, I just decided it was an opportunity I didn't want to turn down," he said. "I actually found out that I had the second-lowest SAT scores at MIT. The guy with the lowest score and I would always hang out together and be like, 'Yeah, we're the second-to-last and last dumbest guy in the school.'" Upon graduating, Bruno worked for a robotics company before deciding to pursue a career in acting.

Career
In 1995, while working as a model for Calvin Klein, Bruno made his television acting debut on the NBC series High Sierra Search and Rescue. He made his film debut in Naked Ambition (1997). In 1998, he had small roles in Saving Private Ryan and When Trumpets Fade and competed in and won a special episode of American Gladiators (1989–96). He co-starred in The Rage: Carrie 2 (1999), Where the Heart Is (2000), Going Greek (2001).

He portrayed an L.A.P.D. cop in The One (2001), a rock musician in The Simian Line (2001), and Harry "Blaine" Mayhugh, Jr., in The Pennsylvania Miners' Story (2002). He also appeared in The Anarchists -Cookbook (2002). 

Bruno had a five-year run as "Colby Granger" on the hit TV show, Numbers from 2005 to 2010.

In May 2010, he joined NCIS for three episodes, playing a disgraced U.S. Army Ranger who worked for a Mexican drug cartel; in the Season 7 finale, his character died in a gunfight.

Bruno has done voice-over work for several products such as Bacardi Silver, Coors Light, Chevrolet, Jeep, Virtual Boy, and Sony Handycam. In addition to his voice-over work, Bruno is the current narrator of the Discovery Channel program Rides.

Personal life
Bruno is married and has three sons. He is an avid spearfisher.

Filmography

Film

Television

References

External links

Sampling of Dylan's voice-over work

1972 births
American male film actors
American male sport wrestlers
American male television actors
American male voice actors
Male actors from Connecticut
Living people
MIT School of Engineering alumni
People from Milford, Connecticut
20th-century American male actors
21st-century American male actors
American Gladiators contestants